Francis Michael Gough (23 November 1916 – 17 March 2011) was a British character actor who made more than 150 film and television appearances. He is known for his roles in the Hammer Horror Films from 1958, with his first role as Sir Arthur Holmwood in Dracula, and for his recurring role as Alfred Pennyworth from 1989 to 1997 in  the four Batman films directed by Tim Burton or Joel Schumacher. He appeared in three more Burton films: Sleepy Hollow, voicing Elder Gutknecht in Corpse Bride and the Dodo in Alice in Wonderland.

Gough also appeared in popular British television shows, including Doctor Who (as the titular villain in The Celestial Toymaker (1966) and as Councillor Hedin in Arc of Infinity (1983)), and in an episode of The Avengers as the automation-obsessed wheelchair user Dr. Armstrong in "The Cybernauts" (1965). In 1956 he received a British Academy Television Award for Best Actor.

At the National Theatre in London Gough excelled as a comedian, playing a resigned and rueful parent in Alan Ayckbourn's Bedroom Farce (1977). When the comedy transferred to Broadway in 1978 he won a Tony Award. One of Gough's most well-received West End roles was as Baron von Epp in the 1983 revival of John Osborne's A Patriot for Me.

Early life
Gough was born in Kuala Lumpur, Federated Malay States (now Malaysia) on 23 November 1916, the son of English parents Francis Berkeley Gough, a rubber planter, and Frances Atkins (née Bailie). Gough was educated at Rose Hill School, Tunbridge Wells, and at Durham School. He moved on to Wye Agricultural College, which he left to go to the Old Vic. During World War II Gough was a conscientious objector, like his friend Frith Banbury, although he was obliged to serve in the Non-Combatant Corps, a member of 6 Northern Company, in Liverpool.

Career
In 1948, Gough made his film debut in Blanche Fury and thereafter appeared extensively on British television. In 1955 he portrayed one of the two murderers (the other was Michael Ripper) who kill the Duke of Clarence (John Gielgud), as well as the Princes in the Tower in Laurence Olivier's Richard III.

He became known for his appearances in horror films; following his performance as Arthur Holmwood in Hammer's original Dracula (1958), his horror roles mainly saw him feature as slimy villains, notably in Horrors of the Black Museum (1959), Konga (1961), The Phantom of the Opera (1962), Black Zoo (1963), Trog (1970), The Corpse (1971), Horror Hospital (1973) and Norman J. Warren's cheaply-made Satanism shocker Satan's Slave (1976). He also spoofed his horror persona in What a Carve Up! (1961) as a sinister butler. He also appeared in the comedy film Top Secret! (1984), alongside Val Kilmer (the latter's first feature film), with whom he would also work later in the film Batman Forever.

Gough guest-starred in Doctor Who, as the titular villain in The Celestial Toymaker (1966) and also as Councillor Hedin in Arc of Infinity (1983). He was set to reprise his role as the Toymaker in the proposed 23rd Season story The Nightmare Fair, but the season and the serial were cancelled and never produced. He also played the automation-obsessed wheelchair user Dr. Armstrong in "The Cybernauts", one of the best remembered episodes of The Avengers (1965), returning the following season as the Russian spymaster Nutski in "The Correct Way to Kill". He was introduced in the first-season episode "Maximum Security" of Colditz as Major "Willi" Schaeffer, the alcoholic second-in-command of the Kommandant (Bernard Hepton). In the Ian Curteis television play Suez 1956 (1979), he portrayed Prime Minister Anthony Eden. In 1981, he was reunited with Laurence Olivier in Granada Television's Brideshead Revisited, portraying the doctor to Olivier's dying Lord Marchmain. He played Mikhel, a slippery assistant to a slain British spy opposite Alec Guinness in the television adaptation of John le Carré's Smiley's People the following year. Gough also appeared in The Citadel (1983) as Sir Jenner Halliday, in 1985's Out of Africa as Lord Delamere and as the fictional deposed KGB spymaster Andrei Zorin in Sleepers.

Later roles
Later in his career, he memorably played Alfred Pennyworth in Tim Burton's blockbuster films Batman (1989) and Batman Returns (1992). He returned to the role in Batman Forever (1995) and Batman & Robin (1997) for Joel Schumacher. Gough was one of two actors to have appeared in the four Batman films in the Burton/Schumacher series - the other being Pat Hingle as Commissioner Gordon. He also voiced the character in two BBC radio dramas - Batman: The Lazarus Syndrome (1989) and the 1994 adaptation of Batman: Knightfall. Gough reprised his role in a 1989 advertisement for Diet Coke and in 2001, in six television commercials for the OnStar automobile tracking system (informing Batman of the system's installation in the Batmobile).

Gough retired in 1999 after appearing in Burton's Sleepy Hollow. He would emerge from retirement twice more, both as a favour to Burton, to voice Elder Gutknecht in Corpse Bride and the Dodo in Alice in Wonderland.

Personal life
Gough was married four times. He married his first wife Diana Graves in 1937; their son Simon Peter was born in 1942 and they divorced in 1948. His second wife was Anne Elizabeth Leon (born 1925). They married in 1950, their daughter Emma Frances was born in 1953 and they divorced in 1962. His third wife was Doctor Who actress Anneke Wills, who portrayed the Doctor's companion Polly. Wills and Gough met at various times during her life, firstly during a theatre trip with her mother in 1952, but they first met formally on the set of Candidate for Murder and the attraction was instant. Gough adopted Wills' daughter Polly and in 1965 their son Jasper was born. Polly died in a motorcycle accident in 1982 at the age of 18, believing that Gough was her biological father. Gough married his fourth wife Henrietta Lawrence in 1981, and they remained together until his death.

Awards and nominations
Gough won Broadway's 1979 Tony Award as Best Actor (Featured Role – Play) for Bedroom Farce. He was also nominated in the same category in 1988 for Breaking the Code.

In 1957 he won a BAFTA TV Award and in 1971, was nominated for a BAFTA Film Award for his work in The Go-Between.

He was nominated for a Drama Desk Award Outstanding Featured Actor in a Play in 1979 for Bedroom Farce and again in 1988 for Breaking the Code.

Death
Gough died from pneumonia aged 94 on 17 March 2011 at his home in Salisbury, Wiltshire, having also been ill with prostate cancer for the previous year. A memorial service was held, he was cremated, and his ashes were scattered in the English Channel.

He was survived by his fourth wife Henrietta, daughter Emma and son Simon (an actor who is married to actress Sharon Gurney, the daughter of the Upstairs, Downstairs actress Rachel Gurney) and Jasper, a photographer. Michael Keaton, who played the title character in the first two theatrical Batman films opposite Gough, paid tribute to him, describing him as sweet and charming, and wrote "To Mick – my butler, my confidant, my friend, my Alfred. I love you. God bless. Michael (Mr. Wayne) Keaton."

Gough was added to In Memoriam at the 18th Screen Actors Guild Awards.

Filmography

Film

Television

References

External links
 
 
 
 

1916 births
2011 deaths
English male film actors
English male television actors
English male stage actors
English male voice actors
20th-century English male actors
21st-century English male actors
People educated at Durham School
Alumni of Wye College
People from Kuala Lumpur
English conscientious objectors
Personnel of the Non-Combatant Corps
Deaths from pneumonia in England
Deaths from prostate cancer
Deaths from cancer in England
Tony Award winners
Best Actor BAFTA Award (television) winners
Drama Desk Award winners
British people in British Malaya
Burials at sea